Theatrical (13 March 1982 – 31 August 2012) was an Irish-bred Thoroughbred racehorse who won the 1987 Breeders' Cup Turf and was a successful sire.

Background
Theatrical was a tall bay horse with a narrow white blaze,  and white socks on his hind legs bred by Bertram & Diana Firestone at their Gilltown Stud in Kilcullen, County Kildare, Ireland. He was sired by Nureyev the disqualified "winner" of the 1980 2000 Guineas. His dam was the Irish mare Tree Of Knowledge.

Racing career
Theatrical won his only race as a two-year-old, a maiden race over eight and a half furlongs at Gowran Park in October. Timeform commented "will stay 1¼ miles; sure to go on to much better things."  Racing at age three on the turf, under jockey Michael Kinane he won the Ballysax Stakes and the Derrinstown Stud Derby Trial. In The Derby he was ridden by Lester Piggott and finished seventh behind Slip Anchor. He was re-united with Kinane for the Irish Sweeps Derby in which he finished second to Law Society, but then ran unplaced behind Commanche Run in the Irish Champion Stakes. Late in the year, he was sent to the United States to compete in the Breeders' Cup Turf at Aqueduct Racetrack in New York City, where he finished eleventh. Theatrical returned to race in the 1986 Turf, where the heavily favored Dancing Brave finished fourth. Theatrical was beaten by a neck in finishing second to Manila.
 
In 1987, Theatrical was brought to the United States and conditioned by new trainer Bill Mott. Under the future Hall of Fame trainer, the colt won the Hialeah Turf Cup Handicap and the Turf Classic Invitational Stakes. He also defeated Prix de l'Arc de Triomphe winner Trempolino to win the Breeders' Cup Turf and claim the Eclipse Award for American Champion Male Turf Horse.

Stud record
In 1988 Theatrical stood at stud at Hill 'n' Dale Farms near Lexington, Kentucky. He was pensioned October 13, 2009, due to the infirmities of old age coupled with declining fertility.  He has sired 18 Grade I stakes race winners, and his progeny have earned more than $65 million in purse money. Among his progeny, Theatrical sired Media Puzzle, the 2002 Melbourne Cup winner, Zagreb (Irish Derby), and Royal Anthem, whose wins include the Canadian International Stakes (1998) and the International Stakes (1999). Theatrical was also the damsire of Rail Link, winner of the 2006 Prix de l'Arc de Triomphe, and Sir Mowgli XVII, four-time winning thoroughbred sired by Thunder Gulch.  Sir Mowgli XVII is now a leading Hunter competing throughout the Southwest, having recently relocated to Durango Farms in Coto de Caza, CA. Theatrical was retired from stud in 2009 and lived the remainder of his life as a pensioner at Hill 'n' Dale Farms in Lexington, Kentucky. He was euthanized on August 31, 2012 at age 30 due to "the infirmities of old age."

Pedigree

References

1982 racehorse births
2012 racehorse deaths
Racehorses bred in Ireland
Racehorses trained in Ireland
Racehorses trained in the United States
Eclipse Award winners
Breeders' Cup Turf winners
Thoroughbred family 3-h